The South West African mark was a temporary currency issued between 1916, after the withdrawal of the German South West African mark, and prior to the introduction of the South African pound in 1918.

A number of notes were denominated in South West African marks and pfennigs, especially by the Swakopmund Bookshop that issued 10, 25, 50 Pfennig, and 1, 2, and 3 Mark notes.

Notes

References

See also

 South West African banknote issuers
 Banknotes of the Swakopmund Bookshop

Numismatics
Currencies of the British Empire
Currencies of Namibia
Currencies with multiple banknote issuers
Currencies introduced in 1916